Crowder is a surname originating in Medieval England. Notable people with the surname include:

Alfred Crowder (1878–1961), English cricketer
Alvin Crowder, baseball pitcher
Corey Crowder (born 1969), American basketball player
Channing Crowder, NFL linebacker
David Crowder, American musician
Enoch Crowder, American World War I general
Frederick Crowder (politician) (1850–1902), Australian politician
Grace Meigs Crowder (1881–1925), American physician
Jae Crowder (born 1990), American basketball player
Jamison Crowder, American football player
Jean Crowder, Canadian politician
John Crowder (1891–1961), British politician
John Crowder (1756–1830), English alderman; Lord Mayor of London
Petre Crowder, British politician
Norman Crowder (1926–2013), English Anglican Archdeacon
Randy Crowder, defensive lineman
Richard Crowder (died 1859), Judge Advocate of the Fleet from 1849 to 1854
Richard T. Crowder, Chief Agricultural Negotiator in the Office of the US Trade Representative 
Shirley Crowder (born 1939), American track and field athlete
Steven Crowder, American actor, conservative political commentator, and comedian
Tae Crowder (born 1997), American football player
Tim Crowder (football), American football player
Trae Crowder, American actor, liberal political commentator, and comedian

References